Sergief Island is an island in the Alexander Archipelago, Alaska, located east of Mitkof Island and north of Kadin Island near the mouth of the Stikine River. It lies within the Tongass National Forest.

Islands of Alaska
Islands of the Alexander Archipelago
Islands of Wrangell, Alaska